The Sekondi Sports Stadium (also known as Essipong Stadium) is a multi-purpose stadium in Sekondi-Takoradi, Ghana. It is used mostly for football matches and serves as the home stadium of Sekondi Hasaacas FC. Sekondi-Takoradi Stadium hosted some matches during 2008 African Cup of Nations. The stadium has a capacity of 20,000 people and opened in 2008. The stadium looks similar to the Tamale Stadium.

Gallery

References

External links

 Sekondi stadium cries for renovation. graphic.com.gh
 Ghana-pedia website - Essipon (Sekondi) Stadium

Football venues in Ghana
Sports venues in Ghana
Sekondi-Takoradi
Multi-purpose stadiums in Ghana
Sekondi Hasaacas F.C.
Sekondi Eleven Wise F.C.